The  is one of the largest ski resorts in Japan, operated by Iwate Hotel & Resort, adjacent to the Towada-Hachimantai National Park. The resort is most famous for its ski slopes, but it also has a guest ranch, golf courses, tennis courts, soccer fields, sports clubs, hot springs (onsen), and other amenities.
The resort is 50 minutes from Morioka Station on the Tohoku Shinkansen by non-stop express bus. By car, it is about 30-50 minute drive from the city of Morioka, 15 min from Matsuo-Hachimantai IC on the Tōhoku Expressway, or 20 min from Ashiro IC on the Tohoku Expwy.

History
The development of the resort was led by Hiromasa Ezoe, a Japanese entrepreneur and the founder of the advertising and human resources company Recruit. The name of this area, Appi, is derived from the Ainu language word, meaning "a place where one can live in peace" (Kogen means heights or highlands in Japanese).　The construction began in 1970s and the ski area was opened in December, 1981, with four chair lifts. The 'Sailer' area expansion was designed by Toni Sailer, an Austrian alpine ski racer and actor. The Hotel Appi Grand opened in 1985, and the Appi Hills Shirakaba-No-Mori 3 (formerly the Appi Grand Villa 3) opened in 1991. In 1992, the ski resort attracted 1.5 million visitors in a year. The Hotel Appi Grand Annex opened in 1996. Soccer fields opened in 1998. During 2003-2016, the resort was managed by the Kamori Kanko Group. In 2014, a memorial to Hiromasa Ezoe, the founder of the resort who had died in February 2013, was erected at the resort. Since 2016, the resort has been managed by the Asia Gate Holdings Co., Ltd. In 2005 and 2016, giant slalom races of the National Sports Festival of Japan were held in Appi Kogen.

Skiing
It  is  the largest ski resort operated by a single company in Japan, with an average run of 2.1 km (1.3 mi), Japan’s longest average. Lift service includes 2 gondolas and 14 chair lifts including 3 high-speed quad lifts and 11 double chairlifts. The resort is also family-friendly, with a kid's ski area, child care service, snow play areas, and a petting zoo. The winter ski season in Appi stretches over 5 months from December to early May. Nighttime skiing is available most nights; skiing and snowboarding lesson programs are available. CNN International ranked Appi Kogen the best ski resort in Asia.

Lifts

Golf courses
The Appi Kogen Golf Club has 4 courses, namely Hachimantai Course, Towada Course, Ryugamori Course, and Iwatesan Course, 36 holes in total, opened in 1978. LPGA of Japan Tour tournaments were held in 1984-88 and 1991-92. The Japan LPGA Championship Konica Minolta Cup on the LPGA of Japan Tour was held in the Appi Kogen Golf Club in September 2017.

Other attractions
The ski resort is home to many concerts. A-Nation (2002), Dreams Come True (band) (2003), Glay (1998), Kaela Kimura (2005), Kome Kome Club (1992), L'Arc-en-Ciel (1999), Masayoshi Yamazaki (2000), Monkey Majik (2008), Morning Musume (2001), Mr. Children (1995), Sharam Q (1996), SMAP (2001), and Tube (band) (1994) held concerts in the resort.

Hotels
There are 8 hotels, including the Hotel Appi Grand, the Hotel Appi Grand Tower, the Appi Hills Shirakaba-No-Mori 1-3 (formerly the Appi Grand Villa 1-3), and the Appi Kogen Onsen Hotel 1-3 (formerly the Appi Grand Annex 1-3). There are also B&Bs.

Notable people
 Reiichi Mikata (born 1967), nordic combined skier and Olympic gold medalist; born in Hachimantai city and worked for the Appi Kogen Ski Resort
 Toni Sailer (1935–2009), alpine ski racer and Olympic gold medalist; designed the Sailer Area

See also
List of ski areas and resorts in Asia
List of aerial lifts in Japan

References

External links

Ski areas and resorts in Japan
Sports venues in Iwate Prefecture
Tourist attractions in Iwate Prefecture
Gondola lifts in Japan
Hachimantai, Iwate
Sports venues completed in 1981
1981 establishments in Japan